Robert Edward Rutherford (born 1878) was an English footballer.

Career
Rutherford played in the Football League for Newcastle United. His brothers Sep and Jock were also professional footballers as well as his nephew John.

References

1878 births
Date of death unknown
English footballers
Newcastle United F.C. players
English Football League players
Association football defenders